A Ghost Story is a 2017 American supernatural drama film written and directed by David Lowery and starring Casey Affleck and Rooney Mara, with Will Oldham, Liz Cardenas Franke, Sonia Acevedo, and Rob Zabrecky in supporting roles. It is about a man who becomes a ghost and remains in the house he shared with his wife.

The film had its world premiere at the Sundance Film Festival on January 22, 2017, and was released by A24 in the United States on July 7, 2017. It received positive reviews from critics.

Plot
A woman mentions to her musician husband that she moved a lot as a child and took to hiding little notes wherever she lived. The couple are in disagreement about moving away. Occasionally they hear strange noises and one night there is a loud bang, the source of which they are unable to define.

Shortly afterwards the husband is killed in a car accident a short distance from the house. At the hospital his wife views his body, covering it with a sheet before departing. The husband awakens and, still covered by the sheet, wanders through the hospital. He is invisible to the living, as he is now a ghost. A door of light opens before him but he makes no attempt to approach it and it closes.

The ghost walks home and sees Linda, his landlord, drop off a pie. When the wife gets home she sits on the floor and eats the pie until she vomits.

Unable to communicate, the ghost watches while the wife grieves and then begins to proceed with her life. In the house next door he sees a ghost covered by a flower-print sheet who communicates that it is waiting for someone, though it does not remember who.

The wife comes home with a man whom she kisses in the doorway, and the ghost makes the lights flicker and knocks books from a shelf. Later, the wife listens to one of her husband's songs and recalls when he played her the recording for the first time. She moves away but first writes a short note and hides it in a gap between some molding, which she paints over. The ghost picks at the paint but he is unable to reach the note.

A Spanish-speaking mother moves into the house with her young son and daughter. The ghost watches them eat, play the piano and celebrate Christmas. The children begin to sense his presence and become frightened. One night, the ghost knocks a framed photo of the family off the piano and smashes dishes in the kitchen. The family moves out and the ghost again scrapes at the paint.

At a party thrown by the next occupants a woman says she has stopped working on her novel and a man responds by musing about what the point is of any creative pursuit, even one as uplifting and universally known as Beethoven's 9th Symphony, given that the sun will eventually engulf Earth and the universe will eventually rip itself apart. The partygoers notice the lights flicker.

The house is abandoned and becomes derelict and the ghost's efforts to retrieve the note are interrupted by a bulldozer crashing through a wall. The house next door is also torn down and the flower-print ghost communicates that it does not think whoever it is waiting for is coming, and it disappears from beneath its sheet. A skyscraper is built where the house was and, when the work is done, the ghost looks at a futuristic cityscape from a balcony before jumping off the ledge.

The celestial sphere rotates in reverse, and the ghost finds himself in a field in the 19th century with a man who is driving stakes into the ground. The man's wife and three daughters arrive in a covered wagon, and the family prepares to build a house. The youngest daughter writes a note and hides it under a rock while humming the tune of the husband's song. Native Americans attack and kill the family, and the ghost watches the girl's corpse decay.

Back in the house, which is empty except for the piano, the ghost sees himself and his wife enter and look around, and his life in the house repeats itself. The husband's resistance to the wife's desire to move causes tension in their relationship and, the night before his death, he finally acquiesces. Hearing this, the ghost sits down heavily at the piano, causing the bang that had earlier startled himself and his wife. Later, the ghost watches his earlier ghost-self watch the wife leave the house for the last time. He retrieves the note and, upon reading it, disappears, his empty sheet collapsing to the floor.

Cast

 Casey Affleck as C
 Rooney Mara as M
 Kenneisha Thompson as Doctor
 Liz Cardenas Franke as Linda
 Barlow Jacobs as Gentleman Caller
 Sonia Acevedo as Maria
 Carlos Bermudez as Carlos
 Yasmina Gutierrez as Yasmina
 Kesha Sebert as Spirit Girl
 Jared Kopf as Magician
 Will Oldham as Prognosticator
 Brea Grant as Clara
 Augustine Frizzell as Clara's Wife Who is Writing a Book
 Jonny Mars as Oversharing Man
 Rob Zabrecky as Pioneer Man
 Sara Tomerlin as Pioneer Woman
 Margot Tomerlin as Pioneer Child
 Sylvie Tomerlin as Pioneer Child
 Savanna Walsh as Pioneer Child

Production

Development
David Lowery had wanted to make a film featuring a man in a rudimentary ghost costume "for a while", telling Comingsoon.net: "I just loved that image. I love taking something that is understood to be funny or charming or sweet or naive and instilling it with some degree of gravity." When he and his wife got in an argument about moving back to Texas, he began to write down the argument "thinking about my own attachment to physical spaces." After he thought to combine this with the idea about the ghost costume, he came up with the basic concept for the movie fairly quickly and began to write the screenplay in the spring of 2016. Lowery also used the film to work through what he termed "An existential crisis" brought on by reading an article about the possibility of a catastrophic earthquake, saying: "I was not feeling optimistic about the future of mankind. I felt the world was on its way to ending. The film became my way of dealing with those issues." The film's atypical 1.33:1 aspect ratio was chosen by Lowery partially because he thought it was thematically appropriate: "It’s about someone basically trapped in a box for eternity, and I felt the claustrophobia of that situation could be amplified by the boxiness of the aspect ratio."

The ghost costume that was ultimately designed for the film ended up being more complicated than Lowery had anticipated. At first, the filmmakers attempted to simply use a normal bed sheet, but they found that even a king-sized sheet does not fully cover an adult male. The final costume required Affleck to wear certain other garments beneath the fabric to achieve the desired look, and the filmmakers found they had to resort to some "puppeteering" to keep the eyes in place. Beyond the practical constraints of the costume, Lowery also found that it impeded Affleck's ability to act, noting: "every unique physical trait as a human being was pronounced and exaggerated by this sheet over his head." This did not give Lowery the results he wanted, and he eventually solved the problem by reducing the amount Affleck moved, so "it became a matter of patience and posture and moving very specifically, slowly and rigidly."

Filming
Principal photography began in June 2016. The majority of the film takes place within a single house, which was chosen by Lowery because it closely resembled the first house he lived in with his wife. As the house was about to be demolished, the film crew were allowed to use it for free. Some shots of the ghost, specifically those done during pickups or reshoots, do not feature Affleck, instead replacing him with the film's art director, David Pink, who was found to have a similar build.

As the filmmakers did not know how the final product would turn out, the film was shot in secret and not officially announced until November 2016, at which point it was confirmed that Mara and Affleck were the leads. It was later revealed that Kesha would appear in the film in a cameo role.

Music
Daniel Hart composed the score for the film, as he had for all of Lowery's previous features and one short film. A soundtrack of the score was released by Milan Records on July 7, 2017.

Release
Prior to the film's world premiere at the Sundance Film Festival on January 22, 2017, A24 acquired its worldwide distribution rights. The company released the film in the United States on July 7, 2017.

Box office
The film earned $104,030 from four theaters during its opening weekend (an average per-location gross of $26,008), finishing in 26th place at the American box office. By the end of its theatrical run, it had grossed $1,596,371 domestically and $355,312 internationally, for a worldwide total of just under $2million.

Reception

Critical response
On review aggregator website Rotten Tomatoes, the film has an approval rating of 91% based on 285 reviews, with an average score of 8/10; the website's "critics consensus" reads: "A Ghost Story deftly manages its ambitious themes through an inventive, artful, and ultimately poignant exploration of love and loss." On Metacritic, the film has a weighted average rating of 84 out of 100 based on reviews from 46 critics, indicating "universal acclaim".

Peter Debruge of Variety gave the film a positive review, writing: "While Lowery's actual method of delivery may not be scary, it's sure to haunt those who open themselves up to the experience." David Rooney of The Hollywood Reporter also gave the film a positive review, writing: "A poetic meditation on time, memory and spiritual connection that is utterly true to its title." Eric Kohn of IndieWire gave the film an "A" rating, calling it "an extraordinary mood piece that amounts to [Lowery's] best movie yet." Gary Thompson of the Philadelphia Inquirer gave the film two and a half stars out of four and wrote: "The movie is trippy and almost willfully opaque—all I can say for sure is I left A Ghost Story feeling full."

Richard Brody, writing for The New Yorker, included A Ghost Story in his list of the 27 best films of the decade.

Accolades
On September 9, 2017, the film won three awards at the 43rd Deauville American Film Festival: the Revelation Prize, the Critics Prize and the Jury Prize; additionally, David Lowery was nominated for the Grand Special Prize. On October 14, the film won two awards at the Sitges Film Festival: Best Photography and the Carnet Jove Jury Award. At the Fantasia Film Festival, the film won the Camera Lucida Award.

References

External links
 
 
 
 
  

2017 films
2010s ghost films
2017 drama films
American haunted house films
American independent films
2017 independent films
2010s supernatural films
Films about death
Films about music and musicians
Films set in Dallas
Films shot in Dallas
Films directed by David Lowery
A24 (company) films
Films scored by Daniel Hart
American supernatural drama films
2010s American films